Hamed Esmaeilion (born March 12, 1977) is an Iranian-Canadian social activist, author, and dentist. Esmaeilion won Hooshang Golshiri Literary Awards for two of his books, Dr. Datis and Thyme is not Fair.  

Esmaeilion was the president and former spokesman of The Association of Victims' Families of Flight PS752. He resigned on 7 March 2023, after announcing he is planning to focus more on Iranian revolution.

Early life and career 
His parents were originally from Arak, Iran and moved to Kermanshah where Hamed Esmaeilion was born and grew up. He studied Dentistry in University of Tabriz between 1995 and 2000. Afterwards, he worked and lived in various parts of Iran, such as Golestan, Mazandaran and Tehran provinces for several years. He immigrated to Canada together with his family in 2010 and lived in Richmond Hill, Ontario.

Literary life
As a hardworking Persian blogger, Esmaeilion began his literary career by publishing two collections of short stories, Thyme is not Fair (2008, winner of Houshang Golshiri Award) and The Canary Owner (2010). He published two novels, Dr Datis (2013, Zavosh) and Gamasiab Has No Fish (2014) which was also awarded the Golshiri Award.

Death of his wife and daughter

Parisa Eghbalian (Esmaeilion's wife) and Reera Esmaeilion (his daughter - age of 9), flew with Ukraine International Airlines Flight 752 from Tehran to Kyiv on 8 January 2020. This flight was shot down by two surface-to-air missiles of the Islamic Revolutionary Guard Corps (IRGC) shortly after takeoff, killing all 176 passengers and crew aboard, including Esmaeilion's wife and daughter. This incident happened while Iran airspace should have been closed before attack due to ongoing military activities at the time. This flight which was supposed to take off on 5:15 (local time) got delayed and eventually it flew on 6:12 and got struck after a few minutes and crashed near city of Parand.

Esmaeilion is one of the founders and was also the president and the spokesman of The Association of Families of Flight PS752 Victims until March 2023, which he said were trying to "take legal action for this crime" and "commemorate the memory of the dead". He was later featured in 752 Is Not a Number, a Canadian documentary film, directed by Babak Payami and released in 2022.

Opposition to Iranian government
On October 1, 2022, Esmailiyoun organized a global demonstration against the Islamic Republic for Iranians living abroad, in the wake of death of Mahsa Amini to support Iranian's protests against the regime.
These rallies took place in more than 150 cities throughout the world against the Islamic Republic. The largest protests happened in cities such as Sydney, Melbourne, London, Edinburgh, Stockholm, Brussels, Berlin, Rome, Los Angeles, Toronto. It is estimated that in Richmond Hill, Ontario more than 50 thousand protesters attended the rally. Esmaeilion organized another demonstration in Berlin on October 22, 2022 and invited Iranians in Europe to be the voice for protesters in Iran. The number of protesters was estimated at 80,000 to 100,000.

In March 2023, he resigned as the president and the spokesman of The Association of Families of Flight PS752 Victims to focus more on his role in the Iran's "Women, Life, Freedom" revolution.

See also 
Human rights in Iran
Islamic Revolution

References

External links

Living people
Iranian exiles
1977 births
People from Kermanshah
Iranian emigrants to Canada
Mahsa Amini protests